The 3rd Central Committee of the Communist Party of Cuba (CPC) was elected at the 3rd CPC Congress in 1986.

Members

Alternates

References

Notes

Bibliography
Report:
 

3rd Central Committee of the Communist Party of Cuba
1986 establishments in Cuba
1991 disestablishments in Cuba